Akçalı (literally "white shrub" or "white bush") is a Turkish place name and may refer to:

 Akçalı, Adıyaman, a village in the District of Adıyaman, Adıyaman Province, Turkey
 Akçalı, Bartın, a village in the District of Bartın, Bartın Province, Turkey
 Akçalı, Beypazarı, a village in the District of Beypazarı, Ankara Province, Turkey
 Akçalı, Bitlis, a village
 Akçalı, Çanakkale
 Akçalı, Eldivan
 Akçalı, Karaisalı, a village in the District of Karaisalı, Adana Province, Turkey
 Akçalı, Kemaliye
 Akçalı, Kozluk, a village in the District of Kozluk, Batman Province, Turkey
 Akçalı, Sungurlu